Zimbabwe competed at the 2016 Summer Olympics in Rio de Janeiro, Brazil, from 5 to 21 August 2016. This was the nation's tenth consecutive appearance at the Olympics, after gaining its independence from the former Rhodesia.

The Zimbabwe Olympic Committee (ZOC) fielded a team of 31 athletes, 9 men and 22 women, to compete in seven different sports at the Games. It was the nation's largest ever delegation sent to the Olympics in a non-boycotting edition and the second-largest overall in history, a stark contrast to the seven athletes who attended the London Games four years earlier. Among the sports represented by the nation's athletes, Zimbabwe marked its Olympic debut in equestrian eventing and women's football, as well as its return to archery after nearly three decades.

Topping the list of athletes to make the Zimbabwean roster was swimmer Kirsty Coventry. At 32 years old and headed to her fifth Olympic Games, Coventry emerged herself as Zimbabwe's most decorated Olympian of all time, and Africa's most successful female swimmer in history, with a total of seven medals, including two golds in the women's 200 m backstroke. Because of her outstanding achievements in swimming, Coventry was chosen again to carry the Zimbabwean flag at the opening ceremony for the second consecutive Games.

Apart from Coventry, the Zimbabwean team also saw four more athletes competing in more than one edition. Among the returnees were single sculls rower Micheen Thornycroft, marathon runner Wirimai Juwawo, along with his teammate and three-time Olympian Cuthbert Nyasango, and double trap shooter Sean Nicholson, the oldest member of the team (aged 42).

For the second Olympics in a row, Zimbabwe left Rio de Janeiro without a single medal. Before retiring from the sport, Coventry capped off her illustrious Olympic career with a sixth-place finish in the women's 200 m backstroke, the most successful outcome for Zimbabwe at the Games.

Archery

One Zimbabwean archer qualified for the men's individual recurve by obtaining one of the three Olympic places available from the 2016 African Archery Championships in Windhoek, Namibia, anticipating the nation's Olympic return to the sport for the first time since 1988.

Athletics (track and field)

Zimbabwean athletes have so far achieved qualifying standards in the following athletics events (up to a maximum of 3 athletes in each event):

Track & road events

Key
Note–Ranks given for track events are within the athlete's heat only
Q = Qualified for the next round
q = Qualified for the next round as a fastest loser or, in field events, by position without achieving the qualifying target
NR = National record
N/A = Round not applicable for the event
Bye = Athlete not required to compete in round
NM = No mark

Equestrian

Zimbabwe has entered one eventing rider into the Olympic equestrian competition by virtue of a top finish from Africa & Middle East in the individual FEI Olympic rankings. This signified the nation's Olympic debut in the sport of equestrian.

Eventing

Football

Women's tournament

Zimbabwe women's football team qualified for the Olympics by winning the fourth round play-off of the 2015 CAF Women's Olympic Qualifying Tournament.

Team roster

Group play

Rowing

Zimbabwe has qualified one boat each in both the men's and women's single sculls for the Games at the 2015 African Continental Qualification Regatta in Tunis, Tunisia.

Qualification Legend: FA=Final A (medal); FB=Final B (non-medal); FC=Final C (non-medal); FD=Final D (non-medal); FE=Final E (non-medal); FF=Final F (non-medal); SA/B=Semifinals A/B; SC/D=Semifinals C/D; SE/F=Semifinals E/F; QF=Quarterfinals; R=Repechage

Shooting

Zimbabwe has qualified one shooter in the men's double trap by securing one of the available Olympic berths at the 2015 African Continental Championships in Cairo, Egypt.

Swimming

Zimbabwean swimmers have so far achieved qualifying standards in the following events (up to a maximum of 2 swimmers in each event at the Olympic Qualifying Time (OQT), and potentially 1 at the Olympic Selection Time (OST)):

References

External links 

 

Nations at the 2016 Summer Olympics
2016
Olympics